Bolívar is a barrio (neighbourhood or district) of Montevideo, Uruguay, and part of the Mercado Modelo–Bolívar composite barrio.

Location
Bolívar shares borders with Brazo Oriental to the northwest, Cerrito to the north, Pérez Castellanos to the northeast, Mercado Modelo to the southeast, Jacinto Vera to the south.

It is site to the Liberty Building and the Parque de las Esculturas, a park with a permanent display of modern sculptures.

See also 
Barrios of Montevideo

Images 

Barrios of Montevideo